The 2007 Indian vice-presidential election was held on 10 August 2007 to elect Vice-President of India to serve from 2007 until 2012. Mohammad Hamid Ansari from Indian National Congress was elected for the post. The incumbent, Bhairon Singh Shekhawat did not seek reelection and instead ran for President in 2007 election, where he lost to Pratibha Patil. He subsequently resigned from VP post days before Patil's inauguration.

Background
The term of vice-president of India is 5 years, as term of Bhairon Singh Shekhawat was up to 18 August 2007, an election was needed to elect his successor.

Electoral college
The electoral college consists of, all 245 Rajya Sabha members and all 545 Lok Sabha members, a total of 790 voters.

Officers
Returning Officer : Dr. Yogendra Narain, Secretary General, Rajya Sabha
Assistant Returning Officers : N.C. Joshi & Ravi Kant Chopra

Result

|- align=center
!style="background-color:#E9E9E9" class="unsortable"|
!style="background-color:#E9E9E9" align=center|Candidate
!style="background-color:#E9E9E9" |Party
!style="background-color:#E9E9E9" |Electoral Votes
!style="background-color:#E9E9E9" |% of Votes
|-
| 
|align="left"|Mohammad Hamid Ansari||align="left"|INC||455||60.51
|-
| 
|align="left"|Najma Heptulla||align="left"|BJP||222||29.52
|-
| 
|align="left"|Rasheed Masood||align="left"|SP||75||9.97
|-
| colspan="5" style="background:#e9e9e9;"|
|-
! colspan="3" style="text-align:left;"| Total
! style="text-align:right;"|762
! style="text-align:right;"|100.00
|-
| colspan="5" style="background:#e9e9e9;"| 
|-
|-
|colspan="3" style="text-align:left;"|Valid Votes||752||98.69
|-
|colspan="3" style="text-align:left;"|Invalid Votes||10||1.31
|-
|colspan="3" style="text-align:left;"|Turnout||762||96.46
|-
|colspan="3" style="text-align:left;"|Abstentions||28||3.54
|-
|colspan="3" style="text-align:left;"|Electors||790|| style="background:#e9e9e9;"|
|-
|}

See also
 2007 Indian presidential election

References

External links

Vice-presidential elections in India
India